Ghent Creek is a  long 4th order tributary to the Hyco River in Person County, North Carolina.  This is the only stream of this name in the United States.

Variant names
According to the Geographic Names Information System, it has also been known historically as:
Ghents Creek

Course
Ghent Creek rises in a pond about 0.5 miles northwest of Five Forks, North Carolina, and then flows northeast to join the Hyco River about 4 miles north-northwest of Woodsdale.

Watershed
Ghent Creek drains  of area, receives about 46.1 in/year of precipitation, has a wetness index of 379.32, and is about 52% forested.

References

Rivers of North Carolina
Rivers of Person County, North Carolina
Tributaries of the Roanoke River